The 1976 National Invitation Tournament was the 1976 edition of the annual NCAA college basketball competition.

Selected teams
Below is a list of the 12 teams selected for the tournament.

 Charlotte
 Holy Cross
 Kansas State
 Kentucky
 Louisville
 Niagara
 North Carolina A&T
 North Carolina State
 Oregon
 Providence
 Saint Peter's
 San Francisco

Brackets
Below is the tournament bracket.

See also
 1976 NCAA Division I basketball tournament
 1976 NCAA Division II basketball tournament
 1976 NCAA Division III basketball tournament
 1976 NAIA Division I men's basketball tournament
 1976 National Women's Invitational Tournament

References

National Invitation
National Invitation Tournament
1970s in Manhattan
Basketball in New York City
College sports in New York City
Madison Square Garden
National Invitation Tournament
National Invitation Tournament
Sports competitions in New York City
Sports in Manhattan